After the end of World War II, the United States is accused of the support of political leaders and factions who claimed to be anti-communist, but turned out to be authoritarian and often unable or unwilling to promote modernization. U.S. officials have been accused of collaborating with oppressive regimes and anti-democratic governments to secure their military bases from Central America to Africa, Asia, and the Middle East. The Economist Democracy Index classifies many of the forty-five current non-democratic U.S. base hosts as fully "authoritarian governments".  
In cases like the 1953 Iranian and the 1973 Chilean coups d'état, United States participated in overthrowing democratically-elected governments in favor of dictators aligned with the West. A justification for the support of authoritarians was that the resulting stability would facilitate economic progress, and that democratic institutions could be gradually encouraged and built.

Background
During the Cold War, the leaders of developing countries received political and economic benefits in exchange for their alliance with one of the two superpowers, namely, the United States and the Soviet Union. The advantages for these rulers included financial support and military assistance. As a result, some dictators amassed fortunes at the expense of their nations and were able to maintain their rule by building formidable armies. In turn, the Soviet Union and the United States gained access to markets for their manufactured goods and locations for their military bases and missile stations. In particular, according to Chirico, the two superpowers supplied weapons to dictators which strengthened their armies and helped in quelling uprisings.
Military bases in non-democratic states were often rationalized during the Cold War by the U.S. as a necessary but undesirable side effect of defending against the communist threat posed by the Soviet Union. Few of these bases have been abandoned since the end of the Cold War with the collapse of the Soviet Union.

Examples
After World War II, the United States was caught up in struggle against the Soviet dictatorship, which had always been seen as totalitarian and then appeared to be expansionist too. In United States global effort to organize the so-called free world and maintain the line against communist expansion, the Republic of China was also seen as an expansionist and totalitarian dictatorship.

In the Middle East, Asia, Latin America, and Africa, Osita G. Afoaku writes, the United States was on the side of authoritarian regimes such as the Shah of Iran, Ferdinand Marcos of the Philippines, Somoza dynasty of Nicaragua, Fulgencio Batista of Cuba, Mobutu Sese Seko of Republic of the Congo, Emperor Haile Selassie of Ethiopia.

According to the journalist Glenn Greenwald, the American diplomat Henry Kissinger initiated the U.S.'s arms-for-petrodollars program for the autocratic regimes of Saudi Arabia and pre-revolutionary Iran, supported coups and death squads throughout Latin America, and supported the Indonesian dictator and close U.S. ally Suharto. Greenwald notes that Jeane Kirkpatrick, the U.S. ambassador to the U.N. under President Reagan, was praised for her open support of pro-Western and right-wing oppressors including the Shah of Iran and Nicaragua's military dictator Anastasio Somoza, both of whom "were positively friendly to the U.S., sending their sons and others to be educated in our universities, voting with us in the United Nations, and regularly supporting American interests and positions even when these entailed personal and political cost." 

On the occasion of the death of the U.S.-backed military dictator, Augusto Pinochet, who had ruled Chile after overthrowing the democratically elected leftist president, a Washington Post editorial page praised Kirkpatrick and Pinochet. The Post praised "the free-market policies that produced the Chilean economic miracle" while acknowledging that the Chilean dictator was "brutal: more than 3,000 people were killed by his government and tens of thousands tortured," concluding that "Kirkpatrick, too, was vilified by the left. Yet by now, it should be obvious: She was right." After Venezuela's elected left-wing President Hugo Chávez was temporarily ousted in a right-wing coup in 2002, the New York Times editorial page hailed the event as a victory for democracy: "With yesterday's resignation of President Hugo Chávez, Venezuelan democracy is no longer threatened by a would-be dictator. Mr. Chávez, a ruinous demagogue, stepped down after the military intervened and handed power to a respected business leader."

According to Claude Ake, while the United States continued to present itself as the leader of the free world in the 1990s, it sold more weapons to developing countries than all other arms traders combined. According to U.S. Representative Cynthia McKinney and Senator John Kerry, "[d]espite rhetorical pledges to promote democracy and constrain the spread of weaponry worldwide, the Clinton administration has continued the Cold War and Bush administration policy of providing substantial amounts of weapons and training to the armed forces of non-democratic governments". In a 1997 report, Demilitarization for Democracy (DFD) found that while democratic governments received 18 percent ($8 billion), non-democratic governments received 82 percent ($36 billion) of the $44.0 billion in arms and training provided to countries with U.S. Government approval during President Clinton's first four years in office. 
The authors concluded that "[t]he United States is increasingly dependent on the developing nations to keep its high share of the global arms market."  This trend is clearly shown by the data in the table below, which shows that the leading non-democratic recipients of American military support during Clinton's first term.

Rationale
According to Los Angeles Times, American authorities believe that assisting authoritarian regimes or what they refer to as "friendly governments" benefits the United States and other nations. Journalist Glenn Greenwald states that the strategic justification for American support of dictatorships around the world has remained constant since World War II: 
In his essay, Dictatorships and Double Standards, Kirkpatrick argues that although the United States should encourage democracy, it should be understood that premature reforms may cause a backlash that could give the Communists an opportunity to take over. For this reason, he considered it legitimate to support non-communist dictatorships, adding that a successful and sustainable democratic process is likely to be a long-term process in many cases in the Third World. The essence of the so-called Kirkpatrick Doctrine is the use of selective methods to advance democracy in order to contain the wave of communism.

Some believe that having bases under repressive regimes is critical to deterring "bad actors" and advancing "US interests". According to Andrew Yeo, foreign bases contribute to the general good by ensuring security or financial stability. Additionally, bases support the local economy by creating jobs.
Alternatively, Bradley Bowman, a former professor at the United States Military Academy, argues that these facilities and the forces stationed there serve as a "major catalyst for anti-Americanism and radicalization". Other studies have found a link between the presence of the US bases and al-Qaeda recruitment. These bases are often cited by opponents of repressive governments to provoke anger, protest, and nationalistic fervor against the ruling class and the United States. This in turn, according to JoAnn Chirico, raises concerns in Washington that a democratic transition could lead to the closure of bases, which often encourages the United States to extend its support for authoritarian leaders. This study suggests that the outcome could be an intensifying cycle of protest and repression supported by the United States.
According to the United States National Security Council, the U.S. supports corrupt and brutal governments that hinder democracy and development out of concern "to protect its interest in Near East oil". Eisenhower also discussed what he called the "campaign of hatred against us" in the Arab world, "not by the governments but by the people".
The Wall Street Journal reached a similar conclusion after surveying the views of wealthy and Western Muslims after September 11 attacks.
In this vein, the head of the Council of Foreign Relations terrorism program believes that the American support for repressive regimes such as Egypt and Saudi Arabia is undoubtedly a major factor in anti-American sentiment in the Arab world.

According to Afoaku, the Cold War provided much justification for US arms transfers to developing countries in the 1970s and 1980s. Proponents of the traditional paradigm assumed a rapid decline in U.S. arms and training transfers to these countries after the collapse of the Soviet empire. Conversely, US arms transfers have doubled to an average of $15 billion per year, 85 percent of which has gone to non-democratic governments since 1990. This doubling of arms transfers, in the absence of a compelling strategic rationale, was the result of determined and costly lobbying efforts by arms manufacturers who wanted to replace their small Pentagon orders with foreign orders. The lobbying effort was coordinated by the Aerospace Industries Association (AIA), a Washington, D.C.-based association representing more than 50 major manufacturers. For example, AIA successfully pressured President Bush to approve the sale of F-15E fighter jets to Saudi Arabia. As a result of Israel's agreement to the above contract, it also received the F-14E. Similarly, AIA companies have succeeded in subverting US policy of linking arms sales to human rights improvements.

Footnotes

References

Further reading
 

 

United States foreign policy
Foreign policy
Foreign relations of the United States
Terrorism committed by the United States
Cuba–United States relations
Opposition to Fidel Castro
Iran–United States relations